Have a Go Day, marketed as "Have a Go Day a LiveLighter Event", is a Western Australian event run by the Seniors Recreation Council of Western Australia (SRCWA). 

It is targeted at over-55s and encourages them to participate in activities that help to keep them physically and mentally alert. It started in 1992, and takes place at Burswood Park in November every year as part of Seniors Week.

SRCWA developed Have a Go Day to provide many over-50s the opportunity to come together in one place and try many activities and gather information specific to their age group in one place.

The event started in Taylor Reserve, Victoria Park, then moved to McCallum Park with 30 sites and approximately 400 participants. In 1993 SRCWA was invited by the Burswood Park Board to conduct Have a Go Day in the grounds of Burswood Park. Have a Go Day has grown significantly over the years and has remained at Burswood Park.  Have a Go Day now attracts in excess of 220 exhibitors and an estimated attendance of 15,000 people.

Have a Go Day is an SRCWA event, and is regarded as the premier event for Western Australia's Seniors Week.

Through Have a Go Day, the Recreation Council provides the over-50 demographic a means to explore the importance of how exercise and activity in their lives benefits them physically, mentally and socially, especially as they age.

Activities at Have a Go Day cover a varied range, including canoeing, exergaming, tai chi, and various sorts of dancing.  A range of government and non-government service providers, various clubs and groups also use the event to showcase their organisations. Clubs, groups, seniors agencies and government departments provide information specific to the over-50s, including information which is relevant to pre-retirees and those who have already retired.

Dates

Notes

References 

Events in Perth, Western Australia
Mental health in Australia
Health in Western Australia
Annual events in Australia
November events
Burswood, Western Australia
Old age in Australia